Crossy Road is an arcade video game released on 20 November 2014. It was developed and published by Australian video game developer Hipster Whale, with the name and concept of the game playing on the age-old joke "Why did the chicken cross the road?" The game has also been described as endless runner version of Frogger.

Gameplay and objectives

The objective of Crossy Road is to move a character through an endless path of static and moving obstacles as far as possible without dying. By default, the character is a chicken that must cross a series of busy roads, rivers, and active train tracks, but there are hundreds of other characters, and depending on the character the environment around also changes, with the obstacles varying. For example, when playing as the Astronaut, the environment is space and obstacles include asteroids.

In the original mobile version, the player must hop to go forward or swipe the screen in the appropriate direction to move the character horizontally or backwards. Some characters can only be unlocked with cash or ingame currency. 

There are a number of special characters in addition to regular characters. For example, the Android version includes Android Robot, based on the operating system's Android logo. Other characters include Doge, Archie, Dark Lord, and #thedress, a female character wearing the dress of the same name. Various popular culture references and games are also included, such as Forget-Me-Not and "Emo Goose" voiced by Phil Lester.

The player is able to collect coins; an in-game currency, characterised by its golden-yellowish color, squarish shape and red C in its middle. These are obtained in-game by collection during gameplay, watching advertisements, completing tasks, collecting a free gift given every few real-time hours, and using legal currency to buy them in various amounts. Coins are counted the top right corner of the screen. One hundred coins can be used for a chance at a new character from a lottery machine. If the player owns the Piggy Bank mascot, red coins worth five coins each are added to the game, and coins received from free gifts or watching ads are doubled.

Development
Initially the developers planned to spend only six weeks developing the game, but afterwards realized the game's potential and dedicated another six weeks to completing it. The game's free-to-play model was based on the one for Dota 2. 

A big influence on the team was the success of the game Flappy Bird. Developer Matt Hall noted that "That was when people really wanted to play high-score chasing games, and they were telling people about it, and there was this cool opportunity." Eventually Hall hit upon combining such a game with Frogger.  Other influences included Temple Run, Subway Surfers, Disco Zoo, Skylanders, Tiny Wings and Fez. The game's art style was created by Ben Weatherall.

The Android TV version of Crossy Road can only be played with a game controller.

Reception
The game was a finalist for the Game of the Year Award 2014 for the Australian Game Developer Awards. It received generally positive reviews with Metacritic giving the game a score of 88, TouchArcade giving the game 5/5 stars, BigBoomBoom.com giving the game 5/5 stars, Gamezebo Gaming giving the game 4.5/5 stars, and Apple N' Apps giving the game a 4/5 overall score. Polygon dubbed the game "brilliant" and compared it as an updated take on Frogger, while Time called the game a mix of Frogger and Flappy Bird. At the 2015 Apple WWDC developer's conference Crossy Road was one of the winners of the 2015 Apple Design Awards.

Three months after its initial release, the game earned over $10 million and had over 50 million downloads.

Flat Eric, best known for his appearances in Levi's commercials in 1999, as well as the music video for Flat Beat is an unlockable character. He has been called the best character in the game.

Spin-offs

Disney Crossy Road

In 2016, Hipster Whale and Disney Interactive Studios launched a spin-off video game called Disney Crossy Road on iOS, Android, Windows Phone, Windows 8.1, and Windows 10 devices. It features Disney characters like Mickey Mouse and Donald Duck, as well as some characters from numerous Disney franchises such as Zootopia, Big Hero 6, The Lion King, Tangled, Wreck-It Ralph, Moana, Pixar's Toy Story and Inside Out. At launch, the game features over 100 characters. 

Disney Crossy Road was shut down on iOS, Google, and Amazon on March 12, 2020.

Crossy Road Castle
Crossy Road Castle is an endless co-op platformer that acts as a sequel to Crossy Road, available only on Apple Arcade. It supports up to four players and can be played with either touch controls or a controller. Players are placed in a procedurally generated tower spanning multiple levels and must work together to reach the exit.

See also
 Pac-Man 256
 Freeway
 Frogger
 Retro gaming

Notes

References

External links
 
 
 Disney Crossy Road soundtrack by The Bit Crushers on Amazon.com

2014 video games
Action video games
Android (operating system) games
Apple Design Awards recipients
IOS games
Video games developed in Australia
Windows games
Windows Phone games
Disney video games